Break of Dawn may refer to:
The time of the morning when dawn occurs:

Film
Break of Dawn (1988 film) Chicano films 1988
Break of Dawn (2002 film) (:fr:Entre chiens et loups (film)) Alexandre Arcady 2002

Transport
The tugboat that escorted the trash barge Mobro 4000 in 1987

Music

Albums
Break of Dawn (Do As Infinity album), 2000
Break of Dawn (Rob Base and DJ E-Z Rock album), 1994
Break of Dawn (Goapele album), 2011

Songs
"Break of Dawn", a song by Michael Jackson from his 2001 album Invincible
Break of Dawn, a song by Breakbot from his 2012 debut album By Your Side
"Break of Dawn" (song), a 2010 song by Swedish singer Eric Saade
"Break of Dawn", a song by Firefall	1982
"At the Break of Dawn", a song by Googie Rene And His Band   1957

Other
 Break of Dawn (manga), a 2011 manga by Tetsuya Imai